The National Waterfront Museum, Swansea or NWMS is a museum in Swansea, Wales, forming part of Amgueddfa Cymru – National Museum Wales. It is an Anchor Point of ERIH, The European Route of Industrial Heritage.

Construction and development
Building and exhibition design was carried out by Wilkinson Eyre and Land Design Studio respectively, following an Architectural Design Competition managed by RIBA Competitions. The £33.5 million museum, which secured funding from the Welsh Development Agency and £11 million from the Heritage Lottery Fund was opened in October 2005.

Description and contents

Consisting of a major new slate and glass building integrated with an existing Grade II listed warehouse (formerly the Swansea Industrial and Maritime Museum), the new museum deals with Wales' history of industrial revolution and innovation by combining significant historical artifacts with modern technologies, such as interactive touchscreens and multimedia presentation systems.

Concerns have been raised about the lack of accessibility for the new museum, although it is one of the first museums in the United Kingdom to feature multilingual voiceovers, as well as British Sign Language captioning on all interactive content.

Waterfront Winterland 
Swansea Waterfront Winterland (November 2006 – Present) (Winter Wonderland Swansea)

Waterfront Winterland year 
Swansea Waterfront Winterland 2006 (November 2006 – January 2007)
Swansea Waterfront Winterland 2007 (November 2007 – January 2008)

See also
 Welsh Industrial and Maritime Museum

References

External links 

 National Waterfront Museum Swansea
 BBC News: New museum breaks with tradition

National museums of Wales
Museums in Swansea
Maritime museums in Wales
Industry museums in Wales
Science museums in Wales
Grade II listed buildings in Swansea
Education in Swansea
European Route of Industrial Heritage Anchor Points
Museums established in 2005
2005 establishments in Wales